Mireia García Sánchez (born 31 July 1981 in Viladecans, Catalonia) is a former butterfly swimmer from Spain, who competed for her native country at 2000 Summer Olympics in Sydney, Australia. Prior to that tournament she won the bronze medal in the women's 200 m butterfly at the 2000 European Aquatics Championships in Helsinki, Finland.

References
 Spanish Olympic Committee

1981 births
Living people
Spanish female butterfly swimmers
Olympic swimmers of Spain
Swimmers at the 2000 Summer Olympics
European Aquatics Championships medalists in swimming

Mediterranean Games gold medalists for Spain
Mediterranean Games silver medalists for Spain
Swimmers at the 2001 Mediterranean Games
Swimmers at the 2005 Mediterranean Games
Mediterranean Games medalists in swimming
21st-century Spanish women